Arken can refer to:

 Arken Abdulla, a Uyghur traditional folk song and pop music artist from Xinjiang, China
The ARKEN Museum of Modern Art near Copenhagen, Denmark
The Åsane Storsenter in Bergen, Norway